The following is a list of pipeline accidents in the United States in 2001. It is one of several lists of U.S. pipeline accidents. See also list of natural gas and oil production accidents in the United States.

Incidents 

This is not a complete list of all pipeline accidents. For natural gas alone, the Pipeline and Hazardous Materials Safety Administration (PHMSA), a United States Department of Transportation agency, has collected data on more than 3,200 accidents deemed serious or significant since 1987.

A "significant incident" results in any of the following consequences:
 fatality or injury requiring in-patient hospitalization
 $50,000 or more in total costs, measured in 1984 dollars
 releases resulting in an unintentional fire or explosion.

PHMSA and the National Transportation Safety Board (NTSB) post incident data and results of investigations into accidents involving pipelines that carry a variety of products, including natural gas, oil, diesel fuel, gasoline, kerosene, jet fuel,  carbon dioxide, and other substances. Occasionally pipelines are repurposed to carry different products.

 On January 4, 2001, Williams Gas Pipeline - Southcentral (Texas Gas Transmission) was notified that gas was heard blowing in a field 5 miles west of Shelby, Mississippi. Natural gas was leaking from an 18-inch diameter pipeline in Bolivar County. Property damage was confined to company facilities in a crop field where there were no dwellings along the pipeline corridor.  Investigators uncovered the pipe to find a fracture about 30 inches long circumferentially in a wrinkle bend of the pipe, which was manufactured in 1940.
 On January 4, 2001, a circumferential split in a sharp wrinkle bend caused a leak in a 22-inch diameter natural gas transmission pipeline in Harrisonville, Missouri. The pipe, owned by Panhandle Eastern Pipeline Company, was manufactured in 1931.
 On January 15, 2001, at Lehi, Utah, Questar Gas Company received notification that a Questar line was blowing. A Questar employee arrived on-scene and found that the blowing 20-inch high pressure (300 psi) steel pipeline had been hit by a Caterpillar front end loader at an aboveground span that went about 20 feet across a ravine. Investigation revealed that during the previous night, the front end loader had been stolen from a nearby sand and gravel pit. It is believed that the vandals hotwired the front end loader and used it to pull two trucks from the mud in the hills above the scene of the incident. They then rolled the front end loader down the hill where it struck the pipeline and tore a 9-inch by 3-inch hole in the pipe. The total property damage was $300,838 ($277,838 was the market value of the lost gas, and $23,000 was the cost of the repair).
 On January 17 and 18, a series of gas explosions hit downtown Hutchinson, Kansas, resulting in 2 deaths, and 2 buildings being destroyed. Later, it was discovered that gas was leaking from an underground gas storage cavern in the area.
 On March 22, 2001, at Eustis, Florida, a Florida Gas Transmission Company (Enron) pipeline had a fire when venting gas from a 24-inch diameter pipeline ignited during a planned blowdown. The fire was extinguished about 40 minutes after it ignited. Damage from the fire was limited to company equipment, a backhoe, and adjacent power lines. The cause of the gas ignition is not known.
 On April 1, a Dome Pipeline in North Dakota carrying gasoline ruptured and burst into flames a few miles west of Bottineau, North Dakota. An estimated  of gasoline burned before the pipeline could be shut down. The company attributed the break to damage by an "outside force", which a Bottineau County Sheriff said appeared to be frost that melted at uneven rates, twisting and breaking the pipeline.
 On April 14, a 6-inch petroleum productions failed near Harwood, North Dakota, spilling 40 barrels of fuel oil. There were no injuries. The failure was due to an ERW seam failure, with this particular pipeline having had other ERW seam failures in the past in 1987 and 1993.
 On April 13, 2001, at Glasco, Kansas, dead vegetation was spotted on a flyover along a natural gas transmission pipeline right-of-way. The vegetation was killed by escaping gas. The cause of the leak was a split in a seam near a girth weld on a 36-inch diameter Kinder Morgan Natural Gas Pipeline Company of America line. The pipe was manufactured in 1960.
 On May 1, a MAPCO 10-inch propane pipeline exploded and burned, in Platte County, Missouri. 13,500 barrels of propane were burned.
 On May 24, a bulldozer being used in Taylor County, Texas hit a petroleum pipeline, causing a large petroleum fire. There were no injuries.
 On June 13, in Pensacola, Florida, at least ten persons were injured when two Gulf South Pipeline natural gas lines ruptured and exploded after a parking lot gave way beneath a cement truck at a car dealership. The blast sent chunks of concrete flying across a four-lane road, and several employees and customers at neighboring businesses were evacuated. About 25 cars at the dealership and ten boats at a neighboring business were damaged or destroyed. The eight-inch diameter pipeline was installed in 1943.
On July 8, 2001, a Columbia Gas Transmission Corp. pipeline at Corrine, West Virginia, was damaged by cataclysmic flooding of the Guyandotte River, which washed out 200 feet of pipe where it crossed over the river. Due to washed out roads and bridges and dangerous flooding in the area, it took 5 hours for the crew to reach shutoff valves on both sides of the washout.
 On July 24, a pipeline ruptured and spread burning gasoline near Manheim, Pennsylvania.
 On August 11, at approximately 5:05 a.m. MST, an El Paso Natural Gas 24-inch gas transmission pipeline failed near Williams, Arizona, resulting in the release of natural gas. The natural gas continued to discharge for about an hour before igniting. Stress corrosion cracking was determined to be the cause of the failure.
 On August 12, a bulldozer hit a 14-inch LP gas pipeline near Weatherford, Texas, causing a massive fire. One person was injured.
 On August 17, an Oklahoma crude oil pipeline ruptured after being struck by a machine cleaning roadside ditches, sending oil  into the air and damaging nearby cotton crops with up to  spilled.
 On September 3, at approximately 1 p.m. CST, a rupture occurred near the intersection of the 22-inch diameter T-ML Pipeline and the Black Bayou in Louisiana, resulting in the release of an estimated  of natural gas. In addition, the liquids loss is estimated to be 15,000 gallons. The pipe was manufactured in 1926. The Mid-Louisiana Gas pipeline ruptured and leaked due to internal corrosion.
 On October 4, a drunken man used a rifle to shoot a hole in the Alaskan Pipeline. More than 285,000 gallons of crude oil were spilled, costing more than $13 million to clean up. The man was later convicted and sentenced to 16 years in prison.
 On October 15, a 6-inch diameter ConocoPhillips LPG pipeline failed near Sweeny, Texas, forcing 2 dozen residents to evacuate. About 195,000 gallons of LPG were lost.
 On November 7, 2001, at Westernport, Maryland, a Columbia Gas of Maryland natural gas pipeline built in 1907 was impacted when a wildfire burning on the mountainside crossed over the area and ignited small leaks “that were on a regular monitoring schedule.”
 On November 13, 2001, at Waverly, Kansas, road salt corroded an aboveground eight-inch Williams Gas Pipeline Central pipeline, inducing a leak due to external corrosion of the pipe, which was manufactured in 1977. 
 On or about November 27, approximately 2,575 barrels of Jet A Kerosene (Jet Fuel) discharged from the P-62 pipeline of the TEPPCO Pipeline System into tributaries of the Neches River and the Neches River itself. The release occurred 4 miles southeast of Vidor, Texas. This spill was caused by disbonded coating and external corrosion on the pipeline. This incident was later part of a U.S. Environmental Protection Agency consent decree.
 On December 14, an anhydrous ammonia spill near Algona, Iowa killed nearly 1.3 million fish, the largest fish kill on that state's record-to-date, Iowa state officials said. Koch Industries owned the 8-inch pipeline, and was doing maintenance work on a valve on the pipeline. The plume drifted over a six-mile (10 km) area causing officials to evacuate residents in its path.

References 

Lists of pipeline accidents in the United States
2001 disasters in the United States